Wolters Kluwer N.V. is a Dutch information services company. The company is headquartered in Alphen aan den Rijn, Netherlands (Global) and Philadelphia, United States (corporate). Wolters Kluwer in its current form was founded in 1987 with a merger between Kluwer Publishers and Wolters Samsom. The company serves legal, business, tax, accounting, finance, audit, risk, compliance, and healthcare markets. It operates in over 150 countries.

History

Early history
Jan-Berend Wolters founded the Schoolbook publishing house in Groningen, Netherlands, in 1836. In 1858, the Noordhoff publishing house was founded alongside the Schoolbook publishing house. The two publishing houses merged in 1968. Wolters-Noordhoff merged with Information and Communications Union (ICU) in 1972 and took the name ICU. ICU changed its name to Wolters-Samsom in 1983. The company began serving foreign law firms and multinational companies in China in 1985. In 1987, Elsevier, the largest publishing house in the Netherlands, announced its intentions to buy up Kluwer's stock. Kluwer merged with Wolters-Samsom to fend off Elsevier's take-over bid and formed Wolters Kluwer.  The merger made Wolters Kluwer the second-largest publishing house in the Netherlands.

After the merger, Wolters Kluwer began expanding internationally with the purchase of IPSOA Editore, Kieser Verlag, Technipublicaciones and Tele Consulte in 1989. By the end of the year, Wolters Kluwer expanded its presence to Spain, West Germany and France. The company also launched LEX, its legal information system, in Poland. In 1989, 44% of the company's revenue was earned in foreign markets.

1990s
The following year, Wolters Kluwer purchased J. B. Lippincott & Co. from HarperCollins. The company acquired Liber, a Swedish publishing company, in 1993. The following year it established its first Eastern European subsidiary, IURA Edition, in Bratislava, Slovakia. The company acquired Jugend & Volk, Dalian, Fateco Fîrlag and Juristfîrlaget, Deutscher Kommunal-Verlag Dr. Naujoks & Behrendt and Colex Data in 1995. Wolters Kluwer was operating in 16 countries and had approximately, 8000 employees by the end of that year.

In 1992 Spain was added to the countries where the company has a presence. “Wolters Kluwer España” directed by Miguel Guibelalde, institutional director of the company. 

In 1994, Wolters Kluwer expanded its US legal business by acquiring Prentice Hall Law & Business from Simon & Schuster. In 1995, Wolters Kluwer acquired CT Corporation. The following year, it purchased CCH Inc., a tax and business materials' publisher, for $1.9 billion. The purchase assisted in expanding the company's business in Asia because of CCH Inc.’s involvement in Australia, New Zealand, Japan, Singapore, and Hong Kong. It also purchased Little, Brown and Company’s medical and legal division that year. John Wiley & Son's legal division was purchased in 1997. Waverly, Inc., Ovid Technologies, Inc. and Plenum Publishing Corporation were acquired in 1998 with the intention of developing Wolters Kluwer’s medical and scientific publishing industry.

2000s
In 2002, Wolters Kluwer sold Kluwer Academic Publishers to the private equity firms Cinven and Candover Investments. (It is now part of Springer). The company established its first three-year strategy to deliver sustained value to customers and shareholders in 2003. The New Delhi Wolters Kluwer Health office opened in 2006. In 2017, Wolters Kluwer Education was sold to Bridgepoint Capital. In September 2008, Wolters Kluwer acquired UpToDate, an evidence-based electronic clinical information resource. The following month, the company received a multi-year contract to provide prescription and patient-level data to the United States Food and Drug Administration. In 2009, Wolters Kluwer was named the “Best Place to Work”  in Spain by the Great Place to Work Institute.

2010s–2020s 
Wolters Kluwer acquired FRSGlobal, financial regulatory reporting and risk management firm in September 2010. The acquisition enabled Wolters Kluwer to provide financial organizations comprehensive compliance and risk solutions. The company acquired SASGAS, a financial reporting software solutions provider, to the foreign and domestic bank market in China in October 2011. That December, Wolters Kluwer acquired Medknow, an open access publisher. Also in 2011, Wolters Kluwer sold its pharmaceutical industry-related Marketing and Publishing Service division to Springer Science+Business Media, which led to a workforce reduction at its facility in Ambler, Pennsylvania, eventually leading to the site's closure in 2013.

In 2012, Wolters Kluwer acquired Acclipse, an accounting software provider, and Finarch, an integrated finance and risk solutions. The company's health division tested technology to identify and treat sepsis that December. Wolters Kluwer acquired Health Language, a medical terminology management provider, in January 2013. In May 2013, it acquired Prosoft Tecnologia, a Brazilian provider of tax and accounting software. The company acquired CitizenHawk, an American online brand protection and global domain recovery specialist, in September 2013. That month, Wolters Kluwer acquired Svenson, an Austrian regulatory reporting solutions provider. The acquisition enabled both companies to assist Austrian banks and insurance companies in meeting national and international regulatory requirements.

The company became the fifth participant in the AAISalliance, an arrangement of information providers that make their services available for member insurance companies of the American Association of Insurance Services (AAIS) in April 2014. In May 2014, Wolters Kluwer launched UpToDate, a clinical decision support resource, in the United Kingdom. UpToDate was launched throughout Western Europe a month later. Wolters Kluwer acquired Datacert, a Houston, Texas-based enterprise legal management software and services provider in April 2014.

The company partnered with Anhembi Morumbi University, a private university in São Paulo, Brazil, to provide information and resources to healthcare students and professionals in June 2014. That month, the company's CCH eSign solution won the CPA Practice Advisor Magazine's 2014 Tax & Accounting Technology Innovation Award. The solution won the Software and Information Industry Association's “Best Enterprise Mobile Application” award that year. The company partnered with Broadridge Tax Services in August 2014 to facilitate tax reporting and reconciliation. In September, the company's UpToDate resource was released in Latin America. That month the company extended its partnership with the American Internal Revenue Service. 2014 marked the 15th year of their collaboration. In May 2016, the company acquired Enablon, a global provider of Environmental, Health, Safety & Sustainability and Operational Risk Management software and SaaS solutions. In 2017 Wolters Kluwer partnered with Skopos Labs to develop the Federal Developments Knowledge Center to help legal professionals stay up-to-date on actions by the President and Congress.

In the United States, Wolters Kluwer's Legal & Regulatory Education (the education division of Wolters Kluwer Legal & Regulatory U.S.) published casebooks and legal textbooks through its Aspen Publisher's, Inc. marquee. In 2021, Transom Capital Group purchased the Education division for US$88 million, renaming the entire operation as the standalone Aspen Publishing.

In June 2022, Wolters Kluwer signed and completed an agreement to acquire Level Programs S.L., a provider of legal practice management software in Spain.

Operations
Wolters Kluwer operated under four divisions as of 2013: Legal & Regulatory Solutions (sold to Peninsula Business Services in 2017; Wolters Kluwer continued to operate a division named Legal & Regulatory U.S., which also held on to its Aspen Publisher's, Inc. marquee until 2021), Tax & Accounting, Health and the Governance, Risk & Compliance Division. The company is active in over 150 countries. Approximately 74% of the company's revenue came from online, software and services in 2013. The United States medical publishing business is run through Wolters Kluwer Health.

Sustainability
Wolters Kluwer is listed on the Dow Jones Sustainability Index. The company received the Bronze Class Sustainability Award 2014 from RobecoSAM. Wolters Kluwer is recognized as one of the “Global 100 Most Sustainable Corporations in the World” by Corporate Knights.

See also

 Books in the Netherlands
 Croner Group (a subsidiary from 1977 to 2015)
 European Business Law Review

References

External links
 

Academic publishing companies
Book publishing companies of the Netherlands
Publishing companies established in 1836
Legal publishers
Companies listed on Euronext Amsterdam
Health information technology companies
1836 establishments in the Netherlands
Alphen aan den Rijn